is a Japanese kickboxer, currently fighting in the featherweight division of K-1. He is the former K-1 featherweight champion, having held the title in 2021.

As of July 2022, he is ranked the #3 Super Flyweight in the world by Combat Press. He's been ranked in the division's top ten since October 2020, peaking at #2.

Kickboxing career

Amateur career
At the age of 13, Tsubakihara participated in the Kyoken Junior Kikcboxing tournament. He would win the Kyoken Middleweight title with decision victories over Taiga Imanaga and Taiki Kiyama in the semifinals and finals respectively. He would go on to defend his title three times, all three times against Taiga Imanaga. The first two title defenses ended in split decisions, after an extra round was fought, while Tsubakihara managed to defeat Imanaga by unanimous decision in his third title defense.

Following his third title defense, Tsubakihara took part in the 2015 K-1 Challenge A-Class tournament, competing in the 60kg weight class. He won unanimous decisions against Akito Watanabe in the quarterfinals and Ruka Oonuki in the semifinals, and won the tournament with a majority decision against Tsubasa Okamoto in the finals. Two months later, Tsubakihara fought in a K-1 Koshien tournament, for the first time in his career. He won the first three fights of the tournament, most notably beating Taito Gunji by split decision after two additional rounds were fought, before losing a split decision in turn to Haruma Saikyo in the finals.

Tsubakihara participated in the 2016 K-1 Koshien tournament. He fought the second round of the tournament, against Kaito Nagashima, on July 30, 2016, two months after making his professional debut at the age of 17. He won the first three bouts of the tournament against Nagashima, Souta Saito and Yuta Hayashi, but once again fell short in the finals, losing a unanimous decision to Taito Gunji.

Tsubakihara was eligible to participate in the 2017 K-1 Koshien tournament as well. He managed to win the tournament in his third attempt, beating Toki Tamaru in the semifinals and Itsuki Kobori in the finals.

Super Bantamweight career

Early career
Tsubakihara was scheduled to make his professional debut against Yuki Tanioka at HIGHSPEED EX, on May 22, 2016. He made his professional debut at 55kg. The fight ended in a draw. He notched his first professional victory against Tatsuya Izumi at ALL BOX WORLD 9th, winning the fight by a second-round knockout. His last fight outside of K-1 was against Jin Mandokoro at Hoost Cup Kings Kyoto 2. Tsubakihara won the fight by unanimous decision.

Tsubakihara was scheduled to make his K-1 debut at KHAOS 2, against Taito Gunji. The two of them fought twice as amateurs, trading wins and losses. Tsubakihara won their first professional meeting by majority decision, with two of the three judges scoring the bout in his favor.

Tsubakihara was scheduled to fight Haruma Saikyo at K-1 Survival Wars. The two of them fought previously in the finals of the 2015 K-1 Koshien tournament, with Saikyo winning by split decision. Tsubakihara won the fight by majority decision.

Tsubakihara was scheduled to fight the future Krush Super Bantamweight champion Masashi Kumura at Krush 86. Tsubakihara lost the fight by unanimous decision, with all three judges scoring the bout 30-26 for Kumura.

Tsubakihara was scheduled to fight Riku Morisaka at KHAOS 5. He won the fight by unanimous decision, with two of the judges scoring the bout 30-28 for Tsubakihara.

Krush Super Bantamweight tournament
His 3-1 record earned Tsubakihara a place in the 2018 Krush Super Bantamweight tournament, being scheduled to fight Yusho Kanemoto in the quarterfinal bout at Krush 93. The other tournament pairings pitted Taito Gunji against Riku Morisaka, Shota Oiwa against Masashi Kumura and Shoya Masumoto against Victor Saravia. Tsubakihara won the fight by a second round technical knockdown, managing to knock Kanemoto down three times. The first knockdown came as Tsubakihara countered Kanemoto's step-in knee with a right straight, the second knockdown came as a result of another right straight, while the third knockdown came as a result of a combination of punches after Kanemoto was pressured into a corner.

Tsubakihara advanced to the tournament semifinals, where he was scheduled to fight Taito Gunji at Krush 96. It was their fourth overall career meeting, with Tsubakihara winning two of their previous three meetings. The fight was as close as their previous three bouts, with Gunji winning a split decision, after an extra round was fought.

Later Super Bantamweight career
Tsubakihara was scheduled to fight Ryuto at Krush 100. He won the fight by majority decision, with one judge scoring the bout 29-29, while the remaining two judges scored the fight 30-28 for Tsubakihara.

Tsubakihara was scheduled to fight Aoshi at the K-1 World GP 2019: Japan vs World 5 vs 5 & Special Superfight in Osaka event. Aoshi won the fight by majority decision.

Tsubakihara was scheduled to fight Yuto Kuroda at Krush 108. He won the fight by unanimous decision, winning two of the three rounds according to two of the judges, while the last one scored the fight 30-29 for him.

Featherweight career

The Egawa duology
Tsubakihara was scheduled to make his featherweight debut against Shoya Masumoto at Krush 114. He won the fight by a third-round head kick knockout. During the post-fight press conference, Tsubakihara asked for a fight at the K-1 World GP 2020 in Osaka, his hometown.

Tsubakihara was granted his request, as he was scheduled to fight the newly crowned K-1 Featherweight champion and the 2019 K-1 "Fighter of the Year" Yuki Egawa. Egawa was at the time considered to be the second best kickboxer at 57.5kg, and came into the bout as a significant favorite over Tsubakihara. Tsubakihara kept to his patented outfighting style, keeping distance from Egawa and scoring points through jabs and front kicks. He won the fight by majority decision, with two of the judges scoring the bout in his favor (30-29 and 30-28), while the third judge scored the bout as a draw. The results of the fight was considered a massive upset at the time.

During the post-fight conference, Egawa revealed he had suffered a fracture of the index finger on his left foot, three weeks before the bout, and called for a rematch with Tsubakihara. Tsubakihara agreed to an immediate rematch.

The rematch between Tsubakihara and Egawa was scheduled as the main event of K-1: K'Festa 4 Day 1, with Egawa's K-1 Featherweight title on the line. At the time the bout was scheduled, Tsubakihara and Egawa were considered the #2 and #3 ranked fighters under 58kg in the world, respectively. The fight itself was closely contested, with two of the three judges scoring it 29-29 and 30-30 at the end of the first three rounds, and the third judge scoring it 30-29 for Tsubakihara. Accordingly, the fight went into an extra round, after which Tsubakihara won by split decision. 

Tsubakihara came under criticism for his outfighting style, perceived as boring by the fans, who called for a change in the K-1 ruleset to make for more exciting fights. K-1 later tweaked the ruleset, rewarding strikes with fight-ending intent more than point-scoring strikes.

K-1 Featherweight title reign
Tsubakihara was scheduled to fight Shuhei Kumura  in a non-title bout at K-1 World GP 2021: Japan Bantamweight Tournament. Tsubakihara won the fight by unanimous decision, with the judges scoring the fight 30－29, 30－28 and 30－29 in his favor.

Tsubakihara was scheduled to make his first K-1 Featherweight title defense against the former two-time Krush Super Bantamweight title challenger Taito Gunji at K-1 World GP 2021 Japan on December 4, 2021. Tsubakihara and Gunji fought four times previously, with each holding a single win and loss against the other as amateurs and professionals. Tsubakihara lost the fight by split decision. The fight was ruled a split draw after the first three rounds were contested, with one judge each awarding Tsubakihara and Taito a 30-29 scorecard respectively, while the third judge scored it a 30-30 draw. The judges were once again split after an extra round was fought, with one judge scoring it 10-9 for Tsubakihara, while the remaining two judges scored it 10-9 for Taito.

Post title reign
Tsubakihara faced the Krush Featherweight champion Takahito Niimi at K-1: K'Festa 5 on April 3, 2022. He won the fight by unanimous decision. Two of the judges scored the bout 30–29 in his favor, while the third judge awarded him a 30–28 scorecard.

Tsubakihara faced the one-time Krush featherweight title challenger Toma Tanabe in the quarterfinals of the 2022 K-1 Featherweight World Grand Prix at K-1 World GP 2022 in Fukuoka on August 11, 2022. He lost the fight by a narrow majority decision. Two of the judges scored the fight 30–29 for Tanabe, while the remaining judge scored it as an even 30–30 draw.

Tsubakihara faced Shoki Kaneda at K-1 World GP 2022 in Osaka on December 3, 2022. He lost the fight by unanimous decision, with all three judges scoring the fight 30–26 for Kaneda. Tsubakihara was knocked down with a left hook in the second round, which led to all three judges scoring the round 10–8 for Kaneda.

Titles and accomplishments
Professional
K-1
2021 K-1 World GP Featherweight Championshipn

Amateur
K-1
2017 K-1 Koshien ‐55 kg Champion
2016 K-1 Koshien -55kg Runner-up
2015 K-1 Koshien -55kg Runner-up
2015 K-1 Challenge A-Class -60 kg Tournament Winner
Kyoken Junior Kick
2012 Kyoken Junior Kick Middleweight Champion (3 Defenses)

Awards

 2017 K-1 Awards Rookie of the Year
 2020 Combat Press Upset of the Year

Kickboxing record

|-  style="background:#fbb"
| 2022-12-03|| Loss ||align=left| Shoki Kaneda ||  K-1 World GP 2022 in Osaka || Osaka, Japan || Decision (Unanimous)|| 3 ||3:00 
|-  style="background:#fbb"
| 2022-08-11|| Loss ||align=left| Toma Tanabe ||  K-1 World GP 2022 in Fukuoka, Tournament Quarterfinals || Fukuoka, Japan || Decision (Majority) || 3 ||3:00
|-
|- style="background:#cfc" 
| 2022-04-03 || Win ||align=left| Takahito Niimi || K-1: K'Festa 5 || Tokyo, Japan || Decision (Unanimous) || 3||3:00
|-  style="text-align:center; background:#fbb"
| 2021-12-04 || Loss || align=left| Taito Gunji || K-1 World GP 2021 in Osaka || Osaka, Japan || Ext.R Decision (Split)|| 4 ||3:00 
|-
! style=background:white colspan=9 |
|-  style="text-align:center; background:#cfc;"
| 2021-05-23|| Win || align=left| Shuhei Kumura || K-1 World GP 2021: Japan Bantamweight Tournament || Tokyo, Japan || Decision (Unanimous) || 3 || 3:00
|-  style="text-align:center; background:#cfc;"
| 2021-03-21|| Win || align=left| Yuki Egawa || K-1: K'Festa 4 Day 1 || Tokyo, Japan || Ext.R Decision (Split)|| 4 || 3:00
|-
! style=background:white colspan=9 |
|-  style="text-align:center; background:#cfc;"
| 2020-09-22|| Win || align=left| Yuki Egawa || K-1 World GP 2020 in Osaka|| Osaka, Japan || Decision (Majority) || 3||3:00
|-  style="text-align:center; background:#cfc;"
| 2020-06-28|| Win || align=left| Shoya Masumoto || Krush 114 || Tokyo, Japan || KO (High Kick) || 3||2:02
|-  style="text-align:center; background:#CCFFCC;"
| 2019-11-18|| Win ||align=left| Yuto Kuroda || Krush.108 || Osaka, Japan || Decision (Unanimous) || 3 || 3:00
|-
|- style="text-align:center; background:#FFBBBB;"
| 2019-08-24|| Loss||align=left| Aoshi || K-1 World GP 2019: Japan vs World 5 vs 5 & Special Superfight in Osaka || Osaka, Japan || Decision (Majority) || 3 || 3:00
|-  style="text-align:center; background:#CCFFCC;"
| 2019-04-19|| Win ||align=left| Ryuto || Krush.100 || Tokyo, Japan || Decision (Majority)|| 3 || 3:00
|-  style="text-align:center; background:#FFBBBB;"
| 2018-12-16|| Loss ||align=left| Taito Gunji || Krush.96, Tournament Semifinal || Tokyo, Japan || Ext.R Decision (Split)  || 4 || 3:00
|-  style="text-align:center; background:#CCFFCC;"
| 2018-09-30|| Win ||align=left| Yusho Kanemoto || Krush.93, Tournament Quarterfinal || Tokyo, Japan || TKO (Punches) || 2 || 2:44
|-  style="text-align:center; background:#CCFFCC;"
| 2018-05-26|| Win ||align=left| Riku Morisaka || KHAOS.5 || Tokyo, Japan || Decision (Unanimous)|| 3 || 3:00
|-  style="text-align:center; background:#FFBBBB;"
| 2018-03-10|| Loss ||align=left| Masashi Kumura || Krush.86 || Tokyo, Japan || Decision (Unanimous) || 3 || 3:00
|-  style="text-align:center; background:#CCFFCC;"
| 2017-12-27|| Win ||align=left| Haruma Saikyo ||K-1 Survival Wars|| Tokyo, Japan || Decision (Majority) || 3 || 3:00
|-  style="text-align:center; background:#CCFFCC;"
| 2017-05-13|| Win ||align=left| Taito Gunji || KHAOS.2 || Tokyo, Japan || Decision (Majority)|| 3 || 3:00
|-  style="text-align:center; background:#CCFFCC;"
| 2017-03-05|| Win ||align=left| Jin Mandokoro || Hoost Cup Kings Kyoto 2|| Kyoto, Japan || Decision (Unanimous) || 3 || 3:00
|-  style="text-align:center; background:#CCFFCC;"
| 2016-11-27|| Win ||align=left| Tatsuya Izumi || ALL BOX WORLD 9th || Osaka, Japan || TKO (Flying Knee) || 2 || 0:39
|-  style="text-align:center; background:#c5d2ea;"
| 2016-05-22|| Draw||align=left| Yuki Tanioka || HIGHSPEED EX || Osaka, Japan || Decision || 3 || 3:00 
|-
| colspan=9 | Legend:    

|-  style="background:#CCFFCC;"
| 2017-11-23|| Win ||align=left| Itsuki Kobori || K-1 World GP 2017, K-1 Koshien 2017 Tournament Final || Tokyo, Japan || Decision (Unanimous)|| 3 || 2:00
|-
! style=background:white colspan=9 |
|-  style="background:#CCFFCC;"
| 2017-07-29|| Win ||align=left| Toki Tamaru || K-1 Koshien 2017 Tournament Semi Final || Tokyo, Japan || Ext.R Decision (Majority) || 2 || 2:00
|-  style="background:#CCFFCC;"
| 2017-07-29|| Win ||align=left| Toma Kunimatsu || K-1 Koshien 2017 Tournament Quarter Final || Tokyo, Japan || Decision (Unanimous)|| 1 || 2:00
|-  style="background:#CCFFCC;"
| 2017-07-29|| Win ||align=left| Daiki Mine || K-1 Koshien 2017 Tournament Second Round || Tokyo, Japan || Ext.R Decision (Unanimous) || 2 || 2:00
|-  style="background:#FFBBBB;"
| 2016-11-03|| Loss ||align=left| Taito Gunji || K-1 World GP 2016, K-1 Koshien 2016 Tournament, Final || Tokyo, Japan || Decision (Unanimous)|| 3 || 2:00
|-
! style=background:white colspan=9 |
|-  style="background:#CCFFCC;"
| 2016-07-30|| Win ||align=left| Yuta Hayashi || K-1 Koshien 2016 Tournament, Semi Final || Tokyo, Japan ||Ext.R Decision (Decision) || 2 || 2:00
|-  style="background:#CCFFCC;"
| 2016-07-30|| Win ||align=left| Souta Saito || K-1 Koshien 2016 Tournament, Quarter Final || Tokyo, Japan ||KO|| 1 ||
|-  style="background:#CCFFCC;"
| 2016-07-30|| Win ||align=left| Kaito Nagashima || K-1 Koshien 2016 Tournament, Second Round || Tokyo, Japan || Decision (Unanimous) || 1 || 2:00
|-  style="background:#FFBBBB;"
| 2015-11-21|| Loss ||align=left| Haruma Saikyo || K-1 World GP 2015 The Championship, K-1 Koshien Tournament Final || Tokyo, Japan || Decision (Split)|| 3 || 2:00
|-
! style=background:white colspan=9 |
|-  style="background:#CCFFCC;"
| 2015-08-15|| Win ||align=left| Taito Gunji || K-1 Koshien 2015 Tournament Semi Final || Tokyo, Japan || 2nd Ext.R Decision (Split)||3 || 2:00
|-  style="background:#CCFFCC;"
| 2015-08-15|| Win ||align=left| Reiji Kasami || K-1 Koshien 2015 Tournament Quarter Final || Tokyo, Japan || KO || 1 ||
|-  style="background:#CCFFCC;"
| 2015-08-15|| Win ||align=left| Naoki Takahashi || K-1 Koshien 2015 Tournament Second Round || Tokyo, Japan || Ext.R Decision (Unanimous) || 2 || 2:00
|-  style="background:#CCFFCC;"
| 2015-06-21|| Win ||align=left| Tsubasa Okamoto || K-1 Challenge A-Class -60kg Tournament, Final || Tokyo, Japan || Decision (Majority) || 2|| 2:00 
|-
! style=background:white colspan=9 |
|-  style="background:#CCFFCC;"
| 2015-06-21|| Win ||align=left| Ruka Oonuki || K-1 Challenge A-Class -60kg Tournament, Semi Final || Tokyo, Japan || Decision (Unanimous) || 2|| 2:00
|-  style="background:#CCFFCC;"
| 2015-06-21|| Win ||align=left| Akito Watanabe || K-1 Challenge A-Class -60kg Tournament, Quarter Final || Tokyo, Japan || Decision (Unanimous) || 2|| 2:00
|-  style="background:#CCFFCC;"
| 2013-03-17|| Win ||align=left| Taiga Imanaga || Kyoken Jr Kick 7 || Osaka, Japan || Decision (Unanimous) || 2|| 2:00 
|-
! style=background:white colspan=9 |
|-  style="background:#CCFFCC;"
| 2013-01-20|| Win ||align=left| Taiga Imanaga || Kyoken Jr Kick 6 || Osaka, Japan || Ex.R Decision (Split) || 3|| 2:00 
|-
! style=background:white colspan=9 |
|-  style="background:#CCFFCC;"
| 2012-11-18|| Win ||align=left| Taiga Imanaga || Kyoken Jr Kick  || Osaka, Japan || Ex.R Decision (Split) || 3|| 2:00 
|-
! style=background:white colspan=9 |
|-  style="background:#CCFFCC;"
| 2012-09-02|| Win ||align=left| Taiki Kiyama || Kyoken Jr Kick, Final || Osaka, Japan || Decision  || 2|| 2:00 
|-
! style=background:white colspan=9 |
|-  style="background:#CCFFCC;"
| 2012-09-02|| Win ||align=left| Taiga Imanaga || Kyoken Jr Kick, Semi Final || Osaka, Japan || Decision (Split) || 2|| 2:00
|-  style="background:#CCFFCC;"
| 2012-05-20|| Win ||align=left| Ryo Takahata || Kyoken Jr Kick 2 || Osaka, Japan || KO || ||
|-  style="background:#CCFFCC;"
| 2012-03-11|| Win ||align=left| Hokuto Koyama || Kyoken Jr Kick 1 || Osaka, Japan || KO || 2 ||
|-  style="background:#CCFFCC;"
| 2011-07-24|| Win ||align=left| Yoshiho Tane || KAKUMEI KICKBOXING || Osaka, Japan || Decision (Uannimous) || 3 || 1:30  
|-
| colspan=9 | Legend:

See also
List of male kickboxers

References

Living people
1999 births
Japanese male kickboxers
Sportspeople from Osaka